The Fernando Po swift (Apus sladeniae) is a species of swift in the family Apodidae.

It is found in Angola, Cameroon, Equatorial Guinea, and Nigeria.

The specific epithet is for Constance Sladen, who provided financial support for its discovery.

References

Apus (genus)
Birds of Central Africa
Birds described in 1904
Taxonomy articles created by Polbot